Rachel Hewitt is a writer and lecturer in creative writing at Newcastle University.

Hewitt attended the University of Oxford (BA and PhD) and read her master's degree at Queen Mary University, London. She was elected as a Fellow of the Royal Society of Literature in 2018 and is the author of Map of a Nation: A Biography of the Ordnance Survey (2010) and A Revolution of Feeling: The Decade that Forged the Modern Mind (2017). She is currently working on a new book, In Her Nature, about the relationship between women and the natural world.

Personal life 
Hewitt was married to Pete Newbon, a lecturer in Romantic and Victorian Literature at Northumbria University in Newcastle, who died in January 2022. The couple had three daughters. She is a keen runner and has been running since her mid-20s.

References

External links 
 Rachel Hewitt on The Guardian
 Rachel Hewitt tag on The Bookseller

Living people
Alumni of Queen Mary University of London
Alumni of the University of Oxford
Academics of Newcastle University
British women academics
British writers
British women writers
British literary critics
British women literary critics
Year of birth missing (living people)